Gialdino Gialdini (10 November 1842 – 6 March 1919) was an Italian composer and orchestra conductor.

Gialdini was born in Pescia, Tuscany, and studied at Florence with Teodulo Mabellini. He won a prize offered by the Pergola Theatre of that city for the best opera, with Rosmunda, which met, however, with an unfavourable reception when produced in 1868. After two more operas he tired of composing operas and started conducting opera productions, to international acclaim. In 1889 he conducted Wagner's Lohengrin at Bologna. Later he returned to composing operas. In September 1904 he became the Artistic Director of the Conservatorio Giuseppe Verdi in the then Austrian city of Trieste but had to abandon the post when Italy entered the war against Austria in May 1915. He then returned to his native Pescia for retirement, and died there aged 76.

Works
Rosmunda (opera, premiered 5 March 1868 at the Teatro Pergola, Florence)
La secchia rapita (opera buffa, premiered 1872 at the Teatro Goldoni, Florence)
l'Idolo cinese (opera buffa, premiered 1874 at the Teatro delle Logge, Florence)

I due soci (opera buffa, premiered 24 February 1892 at the Teatro Brunetti, Bologna)
La Pupilla (opera in 2 acts, premiered 23 October 1896 at the Societá Filarmonica Drammatica, Trieste)
La Bufera (opera, premiered 26 November 1910 at the Politeama Ciscutti, Pola)
Album vocale
Minuetto (for string orchestra)  
Eco della Lombardia  (collection of 50 popular songs, edited by Giardini and Giulio Ricordi)

Sources
 "GIALDINI, Gialdino" in Dizionario Biografico degli Italiani (Vol. 54; 2000); at Treccani.it (in Italian)

Links
Marcia Trionfale by Gialdino Gialdini Musical Band in early 90.s

1842 births
1919 deaths
Italian classical composers
Italian male classical composers
Italian conductors (music)
Italian male conductors (music)
Italian opera composers
Male opera composers
19th-century Italian musicians
19th-century Italian male musicians